The Baer pugolovka (Benthophilus baeri) is a species of goby widespread in the southern and central Caspian Sea, to Lenkoran in south. Also near the Chechen Island, Tyuleniy Islands, and in Bakhtemirovskaya Borozdina in north. Males can reach a length of  TL while females only reach  TL.

References

Benthophilus
Fish of Western Asia
Fish of the Caspian Sea
Fish described in 1877
Endemic fauna of the Caspian Sea